The 102nd Panzer Brigade was a Panzer Brigade that fought in World War II.

History

Ordered to be formed on 20 July 1944, it was not formed until 15 August 1944. The brigade was deployed on the Eastern Front and was involved in the Battle of Gumbinnen. The brigade was disbanded on 27 November 1944 and absorbed to the 7th Panzer Division.

Order of battle

2102nd Panzer Battalion (4 Panther companies)      
2102nd Panzergrenadier Battalion (3 half track companies)
2102nd Brigade Support Units
2102nd Pioneer Company

Commanders
Major Curt Ehle

References
Citations

Bibliography
 

Armoured brigades of the German Army in World War II
Military units and formations established in 1944
Military units and formations disestablished in 1944